Paris Jones may refer to:

 Paris Jones (male singer) (born 1990), American male singer
 PJ (singer) (born 1990), American female singer and musician born Paris Jones